The 1947 National Division was the 10th edition of the Turkish National Division. Beşiktaş won their third title.

Participants

Fenerbahçe - Istanbul Football League, 1st
Vefa - Istanbul Football League, 2nd
Beşiktaş - Istanbul Football League, 3rd
Galatasaray - Istanbul Football League, 4th
Ankara Demirspor - Ankara Football League, 1st
Gençlerbirliği - Ankara Football League, 2nd
Altay - İzmir Football League, 2nd
Altınordu - İzmir Football League, 3rd

League standings

Results

References
 Erdoğan Arıpınar; Tevfik Ünsi Artun, Cem Atabeyoğlu, Nurhan Aydın, Ergun Hiçyılmaz, Haluk San, Orhan Vedat Sevinçli, Vala Somalı (June 1992). Türk Futbol Tarihi (1904-1991) vol.1, Page(84), Türkiye Futbol Federasyonu Yayınları.

Turkish National Division Championship seasons
1946–47 in Turkish football
Turkey